Delta Aurigae, Latinized from δ Aurigae, is the Bayer designation for an astrometric binary star in the northern constellation of Auriga. It is visible to the naked eye with an apparent visual magnitude of 3.715. It is drifting further away with a radial velocity of +10 km/s. This star is the namesake for the Delta Aurigids, a meteor shower that occurs between October 6–15. The radiant point for this shower passes several degrees to the south of the star.

The variable radial velocity of this system was not recognized until 1999, more than a century following the first measurement in 1897. Delta Aurigae is a single-lined spectroscopic binary: periodic Doppler shifts in the star's spectrum indicate orbital motion. Based on the small amplitude of the radial velocity variation, the companion is most likely a small K- or early M-type main-sequence star with around half the mass of the Sun.

The visible component of this system is an evolved giant star with a stellar classification of K0 IIIb. It is a member of the so-called "red clump", indicating that it is generating energy through helium fusion at its core.  The star is 3.26 billion years old and is spinning with a projected rotational velocity of 4 km/s. It has 1.63 times the mass of the Sun and has expanded to 11 times the Sun's radius. The star is radiating 62 times the Sun's luminosity from the star's photosphere at an effective temperature of 4,786 K. This heat gives the star the orange-hued glow of a K-type star.

Name
In Indian astronomy, it is known by the name Prajapati , from the Sanskrit प्रजापति prajāpati "the Lord of Created Beings".

References

External links
 HR 2077
 CCDM J05595+5418
 Image Delta Aurigae
 The Constellations and Named Stars
 Star Register

K-type giants
Horizontal-branch stars
Spectroscopic binaries
Astrometric binaries

Auriga (constellation)
Aurigae, Delta
Durchmusterung objects
Aurigae, 33
040035
028358
2077
Prajapati